Oriavchyk is a village (selo) in Stryi Raion, Lviv Oblast, of Western Ukraine. It is located in the Ukrainian Carpathians, within the limits of the Eastern Beskids. Oriavchyk belongs to Kozova rural hromada, one of the hromadas of Ukraine.
Local government — Kozivska village council.

The first written mention dates back to year 1540.

Until 18 July 2020, Oriavchyk belonged to Skole Raion. The raion was abolished in July 2020 as part of the administrative reform of Ukraine, which reduced the number of raions of Lviv Oblast to seven. The area of Skole Raion was merged into Stryi Raion.

Attractions 
The village has two designated monuments of architecture of Stryi Raion.
 Church of the Epiphany (Church of St. Luke) (wood ) 1862 (1417/ 1)
 The bell tower of the Epiphany Church (wood) 1801 (1417/ 2)

References

External links 
 village Oriavchyk
 Орявчик, Церква Святого Миколи 1930; Богоявлення Господнього / Св. Ап. Луки 1862 

Villages in Stryi Raion